Jesse W. "Jess" Smith (1871 – May 30, 1923) was a member of President  Warren G. Harding's Ohio Gang.  He was born and raised in Washington Court House, Ohio, where he became a friend of Harry M. Daugherty. There, Daugherty helped him to become the successful owner of a department store. Smith became Daugherty's gofer during the 1920 campaign.

Role

Smith came to Washington as an aide to Daugherty as U.S. Attorney General. He had a desk at the Department of Justice and was Harry Daugherty's chief advisor. This allowed Smith to wield considerable influence.

He was also Daugherty's roommate at Washington, D.C.'s Wardman Park Hotel. Daugherty's wife had remained behind in Columbus because of illness; Smith was divorced.

Smith is rumored to have sold bonded liquor to bootleggers. He was associated with a house at 1625 K Street (later to become notorious as the Little Green House on K Street) and became an embarrassment to Harding and Daugherty as the Teapot Dome scandal focused increased scrutiny on Harding and his supporters. Before leaving for Alaska, Harding told Daugherty he wanted Smith out of Washington.

On May 30, 1923, Smith died of a gunshot wound, and was found with a pistol at his side. His death was pronounced a suicide, but Alabama Senator James Thomas Heflin alleged otherwise, first at an investigatory hearing and later from the floor of the United States Senate.

"Nobody else knew what he [Smith] knew and with him dead there was nobody to tell the story – so Jesse Smith was murdered," said Senator Heflin, initially.

He followed up two days later, in the Senate, quoting an Alabama bootleggerYou know Secretary Mellon loaned the Republican National Committee $5,000,000 in 1920. Only $3,000,000 has been repaid. There is a deficit of $2,000,000. Jess Smith was charged with getting that money. The plan was to have the liquor men and the breweries contribute to this fund....
"That is one of the reasons," shouted Senator Heflin, "why they wanted to get rid of Jess Smith."

Links with Harding administration
Smith's links with members of the Harding administration, including First Lady Florence Harding, have been documented by Carl Sferrazza Anthony, in his Florence Harding:  the First Lady, the Jazz Age, and the Death of America's Most Scandalous President,  New York:  W. Morrow & Co., 1998

In fiction
Smith "attempts to warn Harding [of his impending murder] but 'commits suicide' in Harry Daugherty's apartment" in Ishmael Reed's 1972 novel Mumbo Jumbo.

Smith is one of four characters (and the only one based on a real person) from whose point of view Gore Vidal's novel of the period, Hollywood, is told. He is portrayed as a business-savvy but weak-willed and sycophantic follower of Harding and Daugherty, and it's speculated that his death might have been a murder used to cover up the Ohio Gang's crimes.

Roy Hoopes' novel Our Man in Washington also speculates that Smith might have been murdered as part of a coverup.

Smith is played by Ed Jewett in season 3 of the television series Boardwalk Empire''.  When Harry Daugherty's office comes under investigation for its connections to bootleggers, Smith becomes increasingly paranoid.  Daugherty comes to see Smith as a loose end and sends fellow Ohio Gang member, Gaston Means, to kill him.  Means plans to kill Smith in his sleep but is unable to surprise him, leading to an awkward confrontation where Smith kills himself.

See also

 President Warren G. Harding's administrative scandals
 Little Green House on K Street

References

External links
 NYPress.com, Conman of the Century - Gaston B. Means

1923 deaths
Warren G. Harding
Suicides by firearm in Washington, D.C.
1871 births
People from Washington Court House, Ohio
Ohio Republicans
United States Department of Justice officials
1923 suicides